"Killin' Time" is a song written by Hayden Nicholas and American country music artist Clint Black, and recorded by Black. It was released in July 1989 as the second single and title track from his debut album. The song was his second number-one hit on the U.S. Billboard magazine Hot Country Singles chart and the Canadian RPM Country Tracks chart. When Billboard published its year-end Hot Country Singles chart for 1989, "Killin' Time" was the No. 2 song of the year — one spot behind Black's "A Better Man." The successes of "A Better Man" and "Killin' Time" were instrumental in Black winning the Country Music Association's Horizon Award in 1989.

Music video
This was his second music video and was directed by Bill Young, and premiered in July 1989. It features Black singing the song at a bar named My Place (the actual name of the bar at the time of filming). He addresses a woman named Minnie in the opening (the name of the original owner of My Place). My Place located in Sealy, TX is now known as Saddleback Saloon. He was wearing a T-shirt that has Don't Mess with Texas written on it, and features him in another singing the song wearing a striped shirt. He puts the guitar down, and the video ends.

At 2:50 into, Clint's brother Brian Black makes a cameo dancing on the dance floor in front of Clint Black (in which viewers confused the guy on the dance floor as George Strait). Also making a cameo appearance in the video as an older Clint is Clint's brother Kevin Black.

Chart positions

Year-end charts

Certifications

Sources

References

See also
Roland, Tom, "The Billboard Book of Number One Country Hits." (Billboard Books, Watson-Guptill Publications, New York, 1991)

1989 singles
1989 songs
Clint Black songs
Songs written by Clint Black
Songs written by Hayden Nicholas
Song recordings produced by James Stroud
Song recordings produced by Mark Wright (record producer)
RCA Records singles